is a Japanese boxer best known to win Bronze at the 2007 world championships at light welterweight.

Career
At the 2007 World Amateur Boxing Championships he sensationally upset Olympic champion Manus Boonjumnong in the first round before being manhandled by eventual winner Serik Sapiyev.

At the 2008 Summer Olympics, he lost the rematch with Manus 1–8.

At the World Championships 2009 he lost his first bout against unsung Egidijus Kavaliauskas. Kawachi then took the bronze medal in the 2009 Asian Amateur Boxing Championships in Zhuhai, China.

References

External links
AIBA INTERNATIONAL BOXING ASSOCIATION  biographies
World Championship results 2007

1985 births
Boxers at the 2008 Summer Olympics
Asian Games medalists in boxing
Boxers at the 2010 Asian Games
Boxers at the 2014 Asian Games
Olympic boxers of Japan
Living people
Japanese male boxers
AIBA World Boxing Championships medalists
Asian Games bronze medalists for Japan
Medalists at the 2014 Asian Games
Light-welterweight boxers